The ancient legend of Ura Naha Khongjomba and Pidonnu is one of the epic cycles of incarnations of Meitei mythology and folklore, that is originated from Moirang kingdom of Ancient Kangleipak (early Manipur). It concerns the love and the adventures of Ura Naha Khongjomba, a forgotten prince, for the beautiful Pidonnu. Khongjomba (1210-1263 AD) was the biological son of King Laijing Ningthou Punsiba (1138-1210 AD) of Moirang and Lady Tonu Laijinglembi, but he was born in the house of his foster father  Kadeng Thangjahanba, the second husband of Tonu Laijinglembi. Pidonnu (also spelled as "Pidonu" or "Pidongnu") was the daughter of a nobleman of Moirang.

History 
Ura Naha Khongjomba (Regnal name: Iwang Puriklai Khongjomba) (1210-1263 AD) was the King ("Iwang Puriklai") of Moirang, and the son of King Laijing Ningthou Punsiba (1138-1210 AD) and Lady Tonu Laijinglembi. Pidonnu (also spelled as Pidongnu) was the queen of King Khongjomba.

Plot 
Kadeng Thangjahanba died on the prime time of his life, leaving his wife Tonu Laijinglembi and her son named Ura Naha Khongjomba (conceived during her stay with King Laijing Ningthou Punsiba). King Laijing Ningthou Punsiba could not produce any further sons. Unfortunately, the king was not fully aware that his son was born in the house of Kadeng Thangjahanba. Lacking an heir, he consulted his courtiers court and chose a young man named Nidrām, on the strength of his princely moral standards, to be his successor.

Tonu Laijinglembi was afraid that her Khongjomba would come to harm if his true identity were revealed. So, she took her young son and fled to the hills, seeking asylum in the house of her husband's friend, the chief of Leihou tribe. She lived there till her son grew to manhood, and then they both returned to the house of late Thangjahanba. During that time, as planned by God Thangching, the people of Moirang had forgotten about the family of the late Kadeng Thangjahanba, and refused to help Tonu Laijinglembi and her son. They lived in poverty, Khongjomba collecting firewood daily and Tonu Laijinglembi selling in the market.

One day, Khongjomba happened to meet Lady Pidonnu, during a game of kang (a traditional Meitei game), played between ladies and gentlemen. Nidrām, the Royal heir, was immediately jealous. So, he sent his men to attack Khongjomba. However, Nidrām's men were overcame by the powerful Khongjomba. Nidrām looked for other ways to harass Khongjomba. One day, Khongjomba was wandering around the Loktak Lake on the day the ladies of Moirang were to take part in a large fishing event. It was the custom of that time that men were not allowed near the lake on this special day. As Khongjomba broke the rules, he was caught beaten by Nidrām and his men. Tonu Laijinglembi ran to King Laijing Ningthou Punsiba to save her son's life. The king remembered that Tonu Laijinglembi was pregnant with his child when she left him. Tonu then revealed the true parentage of her son Khongjomba. King Laijing Ningthou Punsiba surprised and alarmed. Without  delay, he crowned his true son Khongjomba as the sovereign of Moirang, discarding the appointed heir, Nidrām. Later, the two lovers King Ura Naha Khongjomba and Lady Pidonu got married and lived happily ever after.

See also 
 Akongjamba and Phouoibi
 Henjunaha and Lairoulembi
 Kadeng Thangjahanba and Tonu Laijinglembi
 Khamba and Thoibi
 Khuyol Haoba and Yaithing Konu

Further reading

Notes

References

External links 

 

Epic cycles of incarnations
Love stories
Marriage and religion
Meitei folklore
Meitei mythology
Works about death
Works about violence